Kevin Ellis (born 29 May 1965) is a Welsh former professional rugby league and rugby union footballer who played in the 1980s, 1990s and 2000s. A Great Britain and Wales national representative.

Playing career
Ellis won caps for Wales (RL) while at Warrington in 1991 against Papua New Guinea, in 1992 against France, England, and France, in 1993 against New Zealand, in 1994 against France, and Australia, in 1995 against England, and France, in the 1995 Rugby League World Cup against France, Western Samoa, and England, while at Bridgend Blue Bulls in 2003 against Russia, and Australia, and in 2004 against Ireland, and won a cap for Great Britain while at Warrington in 1991 against France. He was selected to go on the 1992 Great Britain Lions tour of Australia and New Zealand.

Ellis played  in Warrington's 12–2 victory over Bradford Northern in the 1990–91 Regal Trophy Final during the 1990–91 season at Headingley, Leeds on Saturday 12 January 1991.

In May 2010 he announced that he would be returning to rugby at the age of 45 for the club that he was coach for, Maesteg RFC in the SWALEC Final.

Ellis also became a patron of Healing the Wounds, a British charity launched in December 2009 to help provide support and care for British servicemen and women suffering from Post Traumatic Stress Disorder.

References

External links
!Great Britain Statistics at englandrl.co.uk (statistics currently missing due to not having appeared for both Great Britain, and England)
Celtic Crusaders profile
(archived by web.archive.org) World Cup 1995 details
Warrington's World Cup heroes - Kevin Ellis
Neath blitz sinks Steelmen
Swansea back on title trail
Welsh legends play on
Bridgend 60-10 Leeds Akkies
Aberavon adventure excites Kelly
Life not all a beach for new boys
Ellis relishes Warrington clash
Ebbw Vale digging in
Sheasby inspires Irish revenge
Vale swamped by Scarlets
Transfer talk
Gloucester punish brave Ebbw
Wasps confident of Sardis success
Evans joins Cardiff
Maesteg win to stay in top flight
Who would you have chosen?
French memories for Cardiff duo
Statistics at wolvesplayers.thisiswarrington.co.uk

1965 births
Living people
Bridgend RFC players
Cardiff RFC players
Ebbw Vale RFC players
Footballers who switched code
Gold Coast Chargers players
Great Britain national rugby league team players
London Irish players
Maesteg RFC players
Pontypool RFC players
Rugby league five-eighths
Rugby league halfbacks
Rugby league locks
Rugby league players from Bridgend
Rugby union players from Bridgend
Sale Sharks players
Treorchy RFC players
Wales national rugby league team players
Warrington Wolves players
Welsh rugby league players
Welsh rugby union players
Workington Town players